Charles Ingoldsby Burroughs-Paulet, 13th Marquess of Winchester PC (27 January 1764 – 29 November 1843) was a British peer and courtier, styled Earl of Wiltshire from 1794 until 1800.

Life
Baptized as Charles Ingoldsby Paulet, he was the eldest son of George Paulet, a courtier, and was educated at Eton and Clare College, Cambridge. In 1774, his father became heir presumptive to some peerages and estates of his third cousin Harry Powlett, 6th Duke of Bolton. After graduating from Cambridge, Paulet was commissioned as an ensign into the 1st Regiment of Foot Guards, serving from 1784–86. He then sat in the Commons as Member of Parliament (MP) for Truro from 1792–96. His father succeeded as Marquess of Winchester in 1794, giving Paulet the courtesy title of Earl of Wiltshire. In 1796 he returned to a part-time military life as Lt.-Colonel of the North Hampshire Militia and in 1798 became Lord Lieutenant of Hampshire. In 1800 he succeeded his father as Marquess of Winchester.

In 1812, Lord Winchester became Groom of the Stole to George III and continued as such under George IV and up until the death of William IV in 1837. When Queen Victoria came to the throne that year, the office was abolished as to the Sovereign – Prince Albert continued to have one, as did the Prince of Wales until the complete abolition of the office in 1901. On 8 August 1839, he added the name of Burroughs to his own, when he inherited the property of Dame Sarah Salusbury (née Burroughs), under the terms of her will.

Lord Winchester died in 1843 and his titles passed to his eldest son, John.

Family
Paulet married Anne Andrews (daughter of John Andrews of Shotley Hall, near Shotley Bridge) on 31 July 1800 and they had seven children:

John Paulet, 14th Marquess of Winchester (1801–1887)
Lord Charles Paulet (1802–1870), a religious minister, married first Caroline Ramsden, and second Joan Granville; ancestor of the 18th and present Marquess of Winchester
Lord George Paulet (1803–1879), an admiral, married Georgina Wood
Lord William Paulet (1804–1893), a field marshal, died unmarried
Lady Annabella (1805–1855), married Rear-Admiral William Ramsden on 31 July 1827
Lord Frederick Paulet (1810–1871), a soldier and equerry to Princess Augusta, Duchess of Cambridge, died unmarried
Lady Cecilia (1806–1890), married Sir Charles des Voeux, 2nd Baronet on 13 December 1842

References

1764 births
1843 deaths
Alumni of Clare College, Cambridge
Grenadier Guards officers
British Militia officers
Lord-Lieutenants of Hampshire
Members of the Privy Council of the United Kingdom
Wiltshire, Charles Paulet, Earl of
Wiltshire, Charles Paulet, Earl of
Charles
13
Grooms of the Stool
Court of George III of the United Kingdom
People educated at Eton College